Placer mining is the mining of stream bed (alluvial) deposits for minerals. This may be done by open-pit (also called open-cast mining) or by various surface excavating equipment or tunneling equipment.

Placer mining is frequently used for precious metal deposits (particularly gold) and gemstones, both of which are often found in alluvial deposits—deposits of sand and gravel in modern or ancient stream beds, or occasionally glacial deposits. The metal or gemstones, having been moved by stream flow from an original source such as a vein, are typically only a minuscule portion of the total deposit. Since gems and heavy metals like gold are considerably denser than sand, they tend to accumulate at the base of placer deposits.

Placer deposits can be as young as a few years old, such as the Canadian Queen Charlotte beach gold placer deposits, or billions of years old like the Elliot Lake uranium paleoplacer within the Huronian Supergroup in Canada.

The containing material in an alluvial placer mine may be too loose to safely mine by tunnelling, though it is possible where the ground is permanently frozen. Where water under pressure is available, it may be used to mine, move, and separate the precious material from the deposit, a method known as hydraulic mining, hydraulic sluicing or hydraulicking.

Etymology
The word placer derives from the Spanish placer, meaning shoal or alluvial/sand deposit, from plassa (place) from Medieval Latin placea (place) the origin word for "place" and "plaza" in English. The word in Spanish is thus  derived from placea and refers directly to an alluvial or glacial deposit of sand or gravel.

An alternative etymology derives the English word from American Spanish placer (placer, sandbank), from earlier placel, apparently from obsolete Portuguese placel (placer, sandbank).

History

Placers supplied most of the gold for a large part of the ancient world. Hydraulic mining methods such as hushing were used widely by the Romans across their empire, but especially in the gold fields of northern Spain after its conquest by Augustus in 25 BC. One of the largest sites was at Las Médulas, where seven 30 mile long aqueducts were used to work the alluvial gold deposits through the first century AD.  

In North America, placer mining was famous in the context of several gold rushes, particularly the California Gold Rush and the Colorado Gold Rush, the Fraser Canyon Gold Rush and the Klondike Gold Rush.

Placer mining continues in many areas of the world as a source of diamonds, industrial minerals and metals, gems (in Myanmar and Sri Lanka), platinum, and of gold (in Yukon, Alaska and British Columbia).

Deposits

An area well protected from the flow of water is a great location to find gold. Gold is very dense and is often found in a stream bed.  Many different gold deposits are dealt with in different ways.  Placer deposits attract many prospectors because their costs are very low.  There are many different places gold could be placed, such as a residual, alluvial, and a bench deposit.

Residual
Residual deposits are more common where there has been weathering on rocks and where there hasn't been water.  They are deposits which have not been washed away yet or been moved.  The residual usually lies at the site of the lode.  This type of deposit undergoes rock weathering.

Alluvial
Alluvial or eluvial deposits are the most common type of placer gold, and are often the richest. They contain pieces of gold that have been washed away from the lode by the force of water, and have been deposited in sediment in or near watercourses or former watercourses. Therefore, they are mostly found in valleys or flood plains.

Bench
Bench deposits are created when gold reaches a stream bed.  Gold accumulations in an old stream bed that are high are called bench deposits.  They can be found on higher slopes that drain into valleys.  Dry stream beds (benches) can be situated far from other water sources and can sometimes be found on mountaintops.  Today, many miners focus their activities on bench deposits.

Deep leads 
Deep leads are created when a former stream bed is covered over by later sediments or by igneous rock from a volcanic eruption. Examples existed in the goldfields of Gulgong and Creswick in Australia. The gold bearing gravel is accessed by shafts and drives similar to underground mining techniques but is processed as alluvial gold.

Methods
A number of methods are used to mine placer gold and gems, both in terms of extracting the minerals from the ground, and separating it from the non-gold or non-gems.

Panning

The simplest technique to extract gold from placer ore is panning. This technique has been dated back to at least the Roman Empire. In panning, some mined ore is placed in a large metal or plastic pan, combined with a generous amount of water, and agitated so that the gold particles, being of higher density than the other material, settle to the bottom of the pan.  The lighter gangue material such as sand, mud and gravel are then washed over the side of the pan, leaving the gold behind.  Once a placer deposit is located by gold panning, the miner usually shifts to equipment that can treat volumes of sand and gravel more quickly and efficiently. Gold panning was commonly used on its own during the California gold rush, however it is now rarely used for profit since even an expert gold prospector can only process approximately one cubic yard of material for every 10 hours of work.

Rocker

A rocker box (or "cradle") is capable of greater volume than a gold pan, however its production is still limited when compared to other methods of placer mining. It is only capable of processing about 3 or 4 yards of gravel a day. It is more portable and requires less infrastructure than a sluice box, being fed not by a sluice but by hand. The box sits on rockers, which when rocked separates out the gold, and the practice was referred to as "rocking the golden baby". A typical rocker box is approximately 42 inches long, 16 inches wide and 12 inches deep with a removable tray towards the top, where gold is placed. The rocker was commonly used throughout North America during the early gold rush, but its popularity diminished as other methods that could handle a larger volume became more common.

Sluice box

The same principle may be employed on a larger scale by constructing a short sluice box, with barriers along the bottom called riffles to trap the heavier gold particles as water washes them and the other material along the box.  This method better suits excavation with shovels or similar implements to feed  ore into the device.  Sluice boxes can be as short as a few feet, or more than ten feet (a common term for one that is over six feet +/- is a "Long Tom"). While they are capable of handling a larger volume of material than simpler methods such as the rocker box or gold panning, this can come at the cost of efficiency, since conventional sluice boxes have been found to recover only about 40% of the gold that they process.

The sluice box was used extensively during the California gold rush for larger scale operations. When streams became increasingly depleted, the grizzly and undercurrent variants of the sluice box were developed. The grizzly is a set of parallel bars placed at a 45 degree angle over the main sluice box, which filter out larger material. The undercurrent variety includes additional, auxiliary sluice boxes where material is initially filtered. It then travels through a trough into the primary sluice box where it is filtered again. Both the grizzly and undercurrent are designed to increase efficiency, and were often used in combination.

Dry washing

Sluicing is only effective in areas where there is a sufficient water supply, and is impractical in arid areas. Alternative methods developed that used the blowing of air to separate out gold from sand. One of the more common methods of dry washing is the Mexican dry wash. This method involves placing gravel on a riffle board with a bellows placed underneath it. The bellows is then used to blow air through the board in order to remove the lighter material from the heavier gold. The amount of gravel that can be processed using the Mexican dry wash technique varies from 1 1/2 to 4 cubic yards per day, and can be processed at a maximum efficiency of 80%. Another form of dry washing is "winnowing". This method was most commonly used by Spanish miners in America, and only requires a blanket and a box with a screen on the bottom. The material is first filtered through the box so only the finer material is placed onto the blanket. The material on the blanket is then flung into the air so that any breeze can blow away the lighter material and leave the gold behind. While this method is extremely simple and requires very few materials, it is also slow and inefficient.

Trommel

A trommel is composed of a slightly-inclined rotating metal tube (the 'scrubber section') with a screen at its discharge end. Lifter bars, sometimes in the form of bolted in angle iron, are attached to the interior of the scrubber section. The ore is fed into the elevated end of the trommel.  Water, often under pressure, is provided to the scrubber and screen sections and the combination of water and mechanical action frees the valuable minerals from the ore. The mineral bearing ore that passes through the screen is then further concentrated in smaller devices such as sluices and jigs.  The larger pieces of ore that do not pass through the screen can be carried to a waste stack by a conveyor.

Gold dredge

Large-scale sifting of placer gold from large volumes of alluvial deposits can be done by use of mechanical dredges. These dredges were originally very large boats capable of processing massive amounts of material, however as the gold has become increasingly depleted in the most easily accessible areas, smaller and more maneuverable dredges have become much more common. These smaller dredges commonly operate by sucking water and gravel up through long hoses using a pump, where the gold can then be separated using more traditional methods such as a sluice box.

Underground mining

In areas where the ground is permanently frozen, such as in Siberia, Alaska, and the Yukon, placer deposits may be mined underground. As the frozen ground is otherwise too hard and firm to mine by hand, historically fires were built so as to thaw the ground before digging it. Later methods involve blasting jets of steam ("points") into the frozen deposits.

Deep leads are accessed by techniques similar to conventional underground mining.

Environmental effects
Although this procedure is not required, the process water may be continuously recycled and the ore from which the sought-after minerals have been extracted ("the tailings") can be reclaimed.  While these recycling and reclamation processes are more common in modern placer mining operations they are still not universally done.

In earlier times the process water was not generally recycled and the spent ore was not reclaimed. The remains of a Roman alluvial gold mine at Las Médulas are so spectacular as to justify the site being designated UNESCO World Heritage status.  The methods used by the Roman miners are described by Pliny the Elder in his work Naturalis Historia published in about 77 AD. The author was a Procurator in the region and so probably witnessed large-scale hydraulic mining of the placer deposits there. He also added that the local lake Carucedo had been heavily silted by the mining methods.

Environmental activists describe the hydraulic mining form of placer mining as environmentally destructive because of the large amounts of silt that it adds to previously clear running streams (also known as the "Dahlonega Method"). Most placer mines today use settling ponds, if only to ensure that they have sufficient water to run their sluicing operations.

In California, from 1853 to 1884, "hydraulicking" of placers removed an enormous amount of material from the gold fields, material that was carried downstream and raised the level of portions of the Central Valley by some seven feet in affected areas and settled in long bars up to 20 feet thick in parts of San Francisco Bay. The process raised an opposition calling themselves the "Anti-Debris Association". In January 1884, the North Bloomfield Mining and Gravel Company case banned the flushing of debris into streams, and the hydraulic mining mania in California's gold country came to an end.

Examples
 The Witwatersrand Basin in South Africa is an example of a placer deposit, as it is a 3 billion-year-old, alluvial sedimentary basin containing at least 70 ore minerals.
 The Klondike Gold Rush began in 1896 when nuggets of gold were found in the Klondike region of Alaska and the Canadian Yukon. The nuggets were found in running water, making the Klondike Gold deposit an alluvial placer mining deposit, which it soon became when 30,000 gold-seekers trekked the region.

See also

Gold in California
Gold mining in Alaska
British Columbia gold rushes
Gold prospecting
Quartz reef mining

References

Notes

Further reading

Assembling California, by John McPhee, published 1993 by Farrar, Straus and Giroux, New Jersey
West, Robert C. Colonial Placer Mining in Colombia. Baton Rouge: Louisiana State University Press 1952.

External links 

Economic geology
Gold mining
Surface mining
History of mining
Mining techniques